Sultan Mehmood Chaudhry is a politician who hails from Azad Kashmir. He served as Prime Minister of Azad Kashmir between July 1996 to July 2001 and is currently serving as the President of Azad Kashmir since 25 August 2021.

Early life
Sultan Mehmood Chaudhry is the son of the late Kashmiri leader Chaudhary Noor Hussain Jatt who also founded Azad Muslim Conference along with Sardar Ibrahim Khan but after Sardar Ibrahim Khan left the party, he led it alone. He belongs to a Jatt family and his family has contributions in the movement for a free Jammu and Kashmir. He has also been a member of Azad Jammu and Kashmir Legislative Assembly.
 
After completing his education, he came back from England to Mirpur in 1987 and joined his father's party Azad Muslim Conference and contested elections and won.

Political Career
In the second elections there, Chaudhry Muhammad Rasheed, Chaudhry Khadim Hussain and Chaudhry Yasin won. Then Sultan Mehmood merged his party with the Liberation league and became its President. Later he left that party and joined Pakistan Peoples Party and became president of Pakistan People's Party for Azad Kashmir. Then he became Prime Minister of Azad Jammu and Kashmir. He faced some problems in the PPP which led to him quitting the party. He then founded his own party Peoples Muslim League in 2005 and his party won 5 seats in the Legislative Assembly. Later when Benazir Bhutto addressed the issue, she apologized and told him to join the party again. He rejoined the Pakistan Peoples Party again but won no seats in the AJK legislative assembly. In February 2015, he joined Pakistan Tehreek e Insaf and became president of its Azad Kashmir chapter. 

On 24 November 2019, he became a Member of the Azad Jammu and Kashmir Legislative Assembly in the by-elections in Mirpur. He owns a shopping plaza in Islamabad and his family owns brick-making factories. Many of their properties were sealed by Sardar Abdul Qayyum when he was the Prime Minister.

He joined Pakistan Tehreek-e-Insaf on 6 February 2015 and lost the elections for the first time in 25 years on 21 July 2016.

He was recently elected as the President of Azad Kashmir on 17 August 2021.

References

External links
Office of the Prime Minister of Azad Kashmir

Jat
Punjabi people
Living people
Year of birth missing (living people)
Government Gordon College alumni
Pakistani barristers
Prime Ministers of Azad Kashmir
Presidents of Azad Kashmir